V Pannerselvam (ta:வி. பன்னீர் செல்வம்; born 1955) is an Indian politician and Member of Parliament for the Salem constituency in Tamil Nadu. He was elected to the Lok Sabha as a candidate of the Anna Dravida Munnetra Kazhagam (AIADMK) party in the 2014 general election.

He is the Deputy Secretary of the party in the city of Salem and was a councillor in the Salem corporation from 2006 to 2011.

References 

All India Anna Dravida Munnetra Kazhagam politicians
Living people
India MPs 2014–2019
Lok Sabha members from Tamil Nadu
1955 births
People from Salem district